Jayantabhai Ki Luv Story is a 2013 Indian Hindi romantic comedy film directed by Vinnil Markan, and produced by Kumar S. Taurani under the banner of Tips Industries. The film stars Vivek Oberoi opposite Neha Sharma in lead roles. The theatrical trailer unveiled on 11 January 2013, whilst the film released on 15 February 2013. The film is a remake of 2010 South Korean film My Gangster Lover  which was later remade in Tamil in 2016 as Kadhalum Kadandhu Pogum.

Plot
The film begins with a prologue of Mumbai and how the city transforms the lives of people. Simran Desai is an engineering graduate who leaves for Mumbai to pursue a career in the IT sector, under the only support of her father. She soon joins an IT company and becomes well settled in life. Things take a toll when the company she works for shuts down suddenly five months later, she faces financial hardship and is forced to move into a low-cost housing colony while searching for a new job. Her neighbour is Abhimanyu, aka Jayantabhai. Simran discovers that Jayanta Bhai is a gangster who works for a don Althaf Bhai. His only aim in life is to own a bar of his own. He had just been released from prison after serving a five-year sentence for taking the blame for a crime he did not commit on the orders of the don. Jayanta did the deed on the promise that his status within the don's gang will be elevated once he is released, but the promise was reneged. Though Simran is initially disdainful of Jayanta's roguish behavior, she gradually warms up to him after he takes her to a hospital all the way on his back when she overdoses of vitamin supplements and passes out in her room. Realizing Jayanta's friendly, caring and humorous nature despite his gangster background, she begins to develop romantic affections for him. Their relationship nurtures to the point that they end up getting intimate one day while drunk.

Facing pressure from her father over her career and wedding, Simran introduces Jayanta to him as her boyfriend who is a successful manager in an IT firm. Her father decides to fix their marriage but changes his mind after seeing Jayanta thrashing a man at a party, realising that he is a rowdy. He bars Simran from returning to Mumbai, even forbidding her to attend an important job interview. Meanwhile, Jayanta starts a gang war by beating up the henchmen of a rival gangster Alex Pandian, who is a former police officer. Althaf Bhai decides that Jayanta should murder Alex. After ensuring that Simran attends her interview, Jayanta proceeds with the plan to murder Alex. Jayanta succeeds in killing Alex, but gets stabbed with a rebar and is left to bleed to death.

Two years later, Simran has become a director in her company and has moved out of the housing colony. She constantly thinks about Jayanta, whom she had never seen again after her interview. Simran yearns to show Jayanta her new life, knowing that he is the one person who will be happier than even herself in her having achieved her dreams. She soon finds Jayanta working at a petrol bunk, having survived his murder attempt and abandoned his rowdy past. The two embrace each other and reunite, starting a new life together.

Cast
 Vivek Oberoi as Abhimanyu  Jayanta Bhai a.k.a. Padosee (neighbour)
 Neha Sharma as Simran Desai a.k.a. Bhadotri (tenant)
 Nassar as Alex Pandian
 Zakir Hussain as Altaf Bhai
 Raj Singh Arora as Kunal (Kunu)
 Rahul Singh as Datta
 Falguni Rajani as Bar girl

Release
The film was expected to be released in summer 2012. In July 2012, the film's posters were released as a promotion for the film, in which it was also announced that the film had been scheduled to be released in October 2012. The film's distributors Tips Music Films released a song promo of the film, "Aa Bhi Ja Mere Mehermann" by Atif Aslam, in November

Soundtrack

The music of the film was directed by Sachin–Jigar while the lyrics are penned by Priya Panchal & Mayur Puri. Atif Aslam has sung 3 songs in the film.

References

External links

2013 films
Indian crime comedy films
Indian romantic comedy films
2010s crime comedy films
2013 romantic comedy films
2010s Hindi-language films
Indian remakes of South Korean films